Thomas Edward Tudor (born 15 March 1935) is an English former professional footballer who played for Gillingham as an inside left.

References

1935 births
Living people
People from Neston
English footballers
Bolton Wanderers F.C. players
Gillingham F.C. players
English Football League players
Sportspeople from Cheshire
Association football inside forwards